Micaelly Brazil dos Santos (born 26 September 2000), simply known as Micaelly, is a Brazilian professional footballer who plays as a midfielder for São Paulo and the Brazil women's national team.

Club career
Born in Autazes, Amazonas, Micaelly began her career in futsal before making her senior debut with local side Iranduba in 2016, aged 15. In August 2017, she moved to Sport Recife, signing a deal until the end of 2018.

On 13 March 2019, after a short period at Avaí (where she did not play), Micaelly signed for Cruzeiro. She departed the latter on 23 December 2020, and was announced at São Paulo the following 11 January.

International career
After representing Brazil at under-17 and under-20 levels, Micaelly was called up for the full side by manager Pia Sundhage on 27 August 2022, for two friendlies against South Africa. She made her full international debut on 2 September, coming on as a half-time substitute for Kerolin in a 3–0 win at the Orlando Stadium in Soweto.

References

2000 births
Living people
Sportspeople from Amazonas (Brazilian state)
Brazilian women's footballers
Women's association football midfielders
Campeonato Brasileiro de Futebol Feminino Série A1 players
São Paulo FC (women) players
Brazil women's international footballers